The Origin of German Tragic Drama was the postdoctoral major academic work (habilitation) submitted by Walter Benjamin to the University of Frankfurt in 1925, and not published until 1928. The book is a study of German drama during the baroque period and was meant to earn Benjamin the qualification of university instructor. The academic community rejected the work, and Benjamin withdrew it from consideration. In spite of this early rejection, the book was rediscovered in the second half of the 20th century and has come to be considered a highly influential piece of philosophical and literary criticism.

History
Benjamin compiled the source material for the work that would become The Origin of German Tragic Drama, some 600 quotations from German baroque dramas, in the Berlin State Library in 1923. In the spring of 1924, he flew to Capri and began composing what he hoped would be his habilitation, the qualification that would allow him to become a university lecturer in Germany. He finished and submitted the work for approval to the Philosophical Faculty at the University of Frankfurt in 1925. The faculty, which included established academics like Max Horkheimer, found the work impenetrable and urged Benjamin to withdraw it from consideration.

Summary
Instead of focusing on the more famous examples of baroque drama from around the world, such as Pedro Calderón de la Barca and William Shakespeare, Benjamin chose to write about the minor German dramatists of the 16th and 17th century: Martin Opitz, Andreas Gryphius, Johann Christian Hallmann, Daniel Caspar von Lohenstein, and August Adolf von Haugwitz. For him, these playwrights – who were seen as too crude, dogmatic, and violent by earlier critics to be considered true artists – best reflected the unique cultural and historical climate of their time. Benjamin singles out the theme of "sovereign violence" as the most important unifying feature of the German "trauerspiel" or "mourning play". In their obsessive focus on courtly intrigue and princely bloodlust, these playwrights break with the mythic tradition of classical tragedy and create a new aesthetic based on the tense interplay between Christian eschatology and human history. Foreshadowing his later interest in the concept of history, Benjamin concludes that, in these plays, history "loses the eschatological certainty of its redemptive conclusion, and becomes secularized into a mere natural setting for the profane struggle over political power."

See also
 Marxist hermeneutics

References

1928 non-fiction books
German literary criticism
Works by Walter Benjamin
Contemporary philosophical literature